"Lola Montez" is a song by Danish rock band Volbeat. The song was released as the third single from the band's fifth studio album Outlaw Gentlemen & Shady Ladies. The song is about the famous dancer and Countess of Landsfeld, Eliza Rosanna Gilbert, with the lyrics referencing the spider dance and an incident with Henry Seekamp.

"Lola Montez" is the band's second straight single, and fourth overall, to peak at number one on the Mainstream Rock Songs chart in the United States.

Track listing

Charts

Certifications

References

2013 songs
2013 singles
Volbeat songs
Republic Records singles
Songs written by Michael Poulsen
Cultural depictions of Lola Montez